Richard Emmanuel Njoh Edimo (born 17 January 1995) is a Cameroonian football player who plays for TP Mazembe

References

External links

1995 births
Living people
Cameroonian footballers
Cameroonian expatriate footballers
Cameroon international footballers
Cypriot First Division players
Doxa Katokopias FC players
Expatriate footballers in Cyprus
Association football midfielders